Alexander Bridges was an English professional footballer. An outside left, his only known club was Blackpool, for whom he made seven Football League appearances in 1932.

References

Year of birth missing
Year of death missing
Place of birth missing
Place of death missing
English footballers
Blackpool F.C. players
Association football outside forwards